Baba and Bhit Islands  are two small and densely populated islands located in the Karachi Harbour, in Karachi, Pakistan. The approximate area of the islands is 4 km² and the population is about 25,000.  The islands are connected to Karachi via a ferry service to Keamari.

The islands, along with Shams Pir, are old fishing villages in the harbor which predate the formal establishment of Karachi. It is claimed that the two islands are over 400 years old. The ethnic groups in Baba & Bhit Islands include 90% Kutchi and 10% Sindhi. 100% of the population is Muslim. The local Kutchi fishermen refer to themselves as Morrio Pata. Villagers from these islands later helped settle Shams Pir.

See also
 List of islands of Pakistan

References

External links 
 Karachi Website
 Islanders — the silent sufferers - Daily Dawn

Neighbourhoods of Karachi
Islands of Sindh
Islands of Karachi
Kiamari Town